The Military ranks of Kosovo are the military insignia used by the Kosovo Security Force. The current rank structure was created, in order to have ranks more similar to NATO standards.

Ranks
Officers

Other ranks

Historical ranks
Ranks used between 2009 and 2012.
Officers

Other ranks

References

External links
 Uniforminsignia.org (Kosovo Security Force 2008-2012)
 Uniforminsignia.org (Kosovo Security Force 2012-)

Kosovo
Military of Kosovo